Khorram Dasht Rural District is a rural district (dehestan) in the Central District of Kashan County, Isfahan Province, Iran. At the 2006 census, its population was 726, in 324 families.  The rural district has 19 villages.

References 

Rural Districts of Isfahan Province
Kashan County